Angel (translit. Angelos) is a 1982 Greek drama film directed by Giorgos Katakouzinos. The film was selected as the Greek entry for the Best Foreign Language Film at the 55th Academy Awards, but was not accepted as a nominee.

Plot
A young gay man in Athens, Angelos, keeps his sexual identity a secret from his family.  He falls hard for a rough sailor, Mihalis, and moves in with him.  Mihalis convinces Angelos to dress in drag and work a corner with other transvestites.  With the money, Mihalis buys a fancy motorcycle and hangs out in bars.  

By day, Angelos is in the army; at night, he is a prostitute.  At Christmas, he visits his grandmother  and learns that both she and his mother were also prostitutes.  A crisis ensues when neighborhood men beat up Angelos: his family is informed, the army discharges him, and his father goes crazy. Then Mihalis wants Angelos gone.

Cast
 Michalis Maniatis as Angelos
 Dionysis Xanthos as Mihalis
 Katerina Helmy as Angelos' Mother
 Vasilis Tsaglos as Angelos' Father
 Giorgos Bartis as Angelos' Ex-boyfriend
 Maria Alkeou as Angelos' Grandmother

See also
 List of submissions to the 55th Academy Awards for Best Foreign Language Film
 List of Greek submissions for the Academy Award for Best Foreign Language Film

References

External links
 

1982 films
1982 drama films
1982 LGBT-related films
Greek LGBT-related films
Greek drama films
1980s Greek-language films
LGBT-related drama films
Films set in Athens
Films about male prostitution
Drag (clothing)-related films